Wild Rover is an album by The Dubliners that was released in 2011. The album charted at number 55 in Ireland.

Track listing
 Introduction
  The Rocky Road To Dublin
  Will You Come To The Bower
  The Kerry Recruit
  Medley: Dublin/Nelson's Farewell
  Roisin Dubh
  Medley: Silgo Maid/Colonel Rodney
  Off To Dublin In The Green
  Banks Of The Roses
  The Patriot Game
  The Old Orange Flute
  Hot Asphalt
  McAlpine's Fusiliers
  Roddy MacCorley
  Love Is Pleasing – The Dubliners, Luke Kelly
  The Mason's Apron
  The Holy Ground
  The Nightingale – The Dubliners, Luke Kelly
  Medley: The Donegal Reel/The Longford Collector
  Finnegans Wake
Disc: 2
  Within A Mile Of Dublin
  Peggy Lettermore
  My Love Is In America
  I'll Tell My Ma
  The High Reel
  Medley: Sunshine Hornpipe/Mountain Road
  The Leaving Of Liverpool
  The Women From Wexford
  Kitty Come Down From Limerick
  Wild Rover
  Preab San Ol
  Jar Of Porter – The Dubliners, Luke Kelly
  The Dublin Fusiliers
  Tramps And Hawkers
  Swallow's Tail – The Dubliners, Luke Kelly
  Foggy Dew
  The Glendalough Saint
  Easy And Slow
  Home Boys Home
  Air Fa La La Lo

Chart performance

References

2011 compilation albums
Sanctuary Records compilation albums
The Dubliners compilation albums